Nassarius reeveanus is a species of sea snail, a marine gastropod mollusk in the family Nassariidae.

Description
The shell of Nassarius reeveanus ranges in size between 14 and 26 mm.  It is patterned with alternating transversal bands of cream and black.

Distribution
Nassarius reeveanus is found in the Indo-Pacific and off Australia (Western Australia).

References

 Dunker, G. 1847. Diagnoses Buccinorum quorundam novorum. Zeitschrift für Malakozoologie 4: 59-64
 Gould, A.A. 1850. Descriptions of the shells brought home by the U.S. Exploring Expedition (cont.). Proceedings of the Boston Society of Natural History 3: 151-156 
 Adams, A. 1852. Catalogue of the species of Nassa, a genus of Gasteropodous Mollusca, belonging to the family Buccinidae, in the Collection of Hugh Cuming, Esq., with the description of some new species. Proceedings of the Zoological Society of London 1851(19): 94-112 
 Gould, A.A. 1860. Descriptions of new shells collected by the United States North Pacific Exploring Expedition. Proceedings of the Boston Society of Natural History 7: 323-340
 Smith, E.A. 1876. A list of marine shells, chiefly from the Solomon Islands, with descriptions of several new species. Journal of the Linnean Society of London, Zoology 12: 535-562, pl. 30
  Marrat, F.P. 1880. On the varieties of the shells belonging to the genus Nassa Lam. 104 pp.
 Wilson, B. 1994. Australian Marine Shells. Prosobranch Gastropods. Kallaroo, WA : Odyssey Publishing Vol. 2 370 pp. 
 Leung KF. & Morton B. (2003). Effects of long-term anthropogenic perturbations on three subtidal epibenthic molluscan communities in Hong Kong. In: Morton B, editor. Proceedings of an International Workshop Reunion Conference, Hong Kong: Perspectives on Marine Environment Change in Hong Kong and Southern China, 1977-2001. Hong Kong University Press, Hong Kong. pp 655-717
 Liu, J.Y. [Ruiyu] (ed.). (2008). Checklist of marine biota of China seas. China Science Press. 1267 pp.
 Kool H.H. (2013) Re-evaluation of several species in the family Nassariidae, considered synonyms of Nassarius reeveanus (Dunker, 1847) by Cernohorsky (1984) and others (Gastropoda: Neogastropoda). Miscellanea Malacologica 6(3): 39‒45.
 Willan R.C. & Beechey D.L. (2015). Description of Nassarius berniceae (Mollusca: Gastropoda: Nassariidae): a new species of shallow water whelk endemic to the Kermadec Islands. Bulletin of the Auckland Museum. 20: 341-347.

External links
 Cernohorsky, W.O. 1984. Systematics of the family Nassariidae (Mollusca: Gastropoda). Bulletin of the Auckland Institute and Museum. Auckland, New Zealand 14: 1-356
 

Muricidae
Gastropods described in 1847